Roger Taylor Gregory (May 31, 1866 – July 8, 1937) was an American attorney and politician who served in the Virginia House of Delegates from 1906 to 1908 and again from 1914 to 1916.

References

External links 

1866 births
1937 deaths
Democratic Party members of the Virginia House of Delegates
20th-century American politicians
University of Richmond alumni
People from Hanover County, Virginia